Seul is the debut album recorded by the Canadian singer Garou. Released in November 2000, this album was a great success in the francophone countries, reaching the top of the charts in France and Belgium (Wallonia) and becoming the best-selling album of 2001. It contains the hit single "Seul" which also topped the charts in these countries.

Track listing
 "Gitan" (Luc Plamondon, Romano Musumarra) — 4:05
 "Que l'amour est violent" (Luc Plamondon, Aldo Nova, Rick Virag) — 5:41
 "Demande au soleil" (Luc Plamondon, Romano Musumarra) — 5:34
 "Seul" (Luc Plamondon, Romano Musumarra) — 4:41
 "Sous le vent" featuring Céline Dion (Jacques Veneruso) — 3:31
 "Je n'attendais que vous" (Jacques Veneruso) — 5:18
 "Criminel" (Luc Plamondon, Franck Langolff) — 3:45
 "Le calme plat" (Élisabeth Anaïs, Franck Langolff) — 4:10
 "Au plaisir de ton corps" (Luc Plamondon, Aldo Nova, Rick Virag) — 4:38
 "La moitié du ciel" (Élisabeth Anaïs, Richard Cocciante) — 4:11
 "Lis dans mes yeux" (Erick Benzi) — 4:04
 "Jusqu'à me perdre" (Bryan Adams, Elliot Kennedy, Luc Plamondon) — 4:27
 "Gambler" (Marc Drouin, Christophe Rose) — 4:37
 "Piotr L'adieu" (Didier Barbelivien) — 4:01

Certifications

Charts

References

2000 debut albums
Garou (singer) albums
Columbia Records albums
Sony Music Canada albums